Year 1 BC was a common year starting on Friday or Saturday in the Julian calendar (the sources differ; see leap year error for further information) and a leap year starting on Thursday in the proleptic Julian calendar. It was also a leap year starting on Saturday in the Proleptic Gregorian calendar. At the time, it was known as the Year of the Consulship of Lentulus and Piso (or, less frequently, year 753 Ab urbe condita). The denomination 1 BC for this year has been used since the early medieval period when the Anno Domini calendar era became the prevalent method in Europe for naming years. The following year is 1 AD in the widely used Julian calendar, which does not have a "year zero".

Events

By place

Han Dynasty 
 Emperor Ai of Han dies and is succeeded by his 8-year-old cousin Ping of Han.
Wang Mang is appointed regent by Grand Empress Dowager Wang Zhengjun, who is his aunt.
 Former regent Dong Xian, who was previously Emperor Ai of Han's lover, commits suicide with his wife.

Roman Empire 
 Gaius Caesar marries Livilla, daughter of Antonia Minor and Nero Claudius Drusus, in an effort to gain prestige.
 The Roman theatre in Cartagena, built by Gaius and Lucius Caesar, finishes construction.
 Aulus Caecina Severus was appointed consul by Emperor Augustus succeeding Cossus Cornelius Lentulus Gaetulicus and Lucius Calpurnius Piso (consul 1 BC).

Kingdom of Kush 
 The approximate date of Natakamani succeeding Amanishakheto as the King of Kush.

Satavahana dynasty 
Kunatala Satakarni is succeeded by Satakarni III.

By topic

Religion 

 Estimated birth of Jesus, in the Christian religion, as assigned by Dionysius Exiguus in his Anno Domini era; according to most scholars, Dionysius used the word "incarnation", but it is not known whether he meant conception or birth. However, at least one scholar thinks Dionysius placed the incarnation of Jesus in the next year, AD 1. Most modern scholars do not consider Dionysius' calculations authoritative, and place the event several years earlier.

Deaths 
 August 15 – Ai of Han, Chinese emperor of the Han Dynasty (b. 27 BC)
 Dong Xian, Chinese politician and commander-in-chief (b. 23 BC)
 Xiaoai, Chinese empress and wife of Ai of Han
 Zhao Feiyan, Chinese empress and wife of Cheng of Han (b. 45 BC)

See also 

 Year zero for the different conventions that historians and astronomers use for "BC" years

References